The following is a list of Alcorn State Braves basketball head coaches. The Braves have had 14 coaches in their 78-season history.

Alcorn State's current head coach is Landon Bussie. He was hired in April 2020 to replace Montez Robinson, whose contract was not renewed after the prior season.

References

Alcorn State

Alcorn State Braves basketball coaches